Otto Wilhelm Hermann von Abich (11 December 18061 July 1886) was a German mineralogist and geologist. Full member of St Petersburg Academy of Sciences (hon. member since 1866).

Biography
He was born in Berlin and educated at the local university. His earliest scientific work is related to spinels and other minerals. Later he made special studies of fumaroles, of the mineral deposits around volcanic vents, and of the structure of volcanoes.  In 1842 he was appointed professor of mineralogy in the university of Dorpat (Tartu), and henceforth gave attention to the geology and mineralogy of the Russian Empire. Residing for some time at Tiflis, he investigated the geology of the Armenian Highland (this term was introduced by Abich) and Caucasus. In 1844 and 1845 he ascended Ararat volcano several times, studied the geological event of 1840 that was centered on Ararat (Akori village). In 1877 he retired to Vienna, where he later died. The mineral Abichite was named after him.

Publications
The following are listed in Chisholm (1911), p. 62:
 Vues illustratives de quelques phenomenes geologiques, prises sur le Vesuve et l'Etna, pendant les annees 1833 et 1834 (Berlin, 1836);
 Ueber die Natur und den Zusammenhang der vulcanischen Bildungen (Brunswick, 1841);
 Geologische Forschungen in den Kaukasischen Ländern (3 vols., Vienna, 1878, 1882, and 1887).

References

Further reading
 

1806 births
1886 deaths
Scientists from Berlin
People from the Margraviate of Brandenburg
19th-century German geologists
German mineralogists
Members of the Prussian Academy of Sciences
Full members of the Saint Petersburg Academy of Sciences
Honorary members of the Saint Petersburg Academy of Sciences
Humboldt University of Berlin alumni
Academic staff of the University of Tartu
Explorers of the Caucasus